was a prolific Japanese actor from the Wakamatsu ward of Kitakyūshū best known for portraying Dr. Shinigami in the original  Kamen Rider series as well as many other characters in tokusatsu films and the Godzilla series.  Amamoto also used the pseudonym of Eisei Amamoto for most of his career, Eisei being a misreading of the kanji in his real name, Hideyo. He died on March 23, 2003 of complication from pneumonia at the age of 77.

Film and television credits

1950
Nijushi no hitomi (1954) as Hisako's husband
The Garden of Women (1954) as Professor (uncredited)
Twenty-Four Eyes (1954) as Ôishi Sensei no Otto
Ai wa furu hoshi no kanata ni (1956) as Chen LongCheng
Yûwaku (1957) as Kyôzô Ikegami
Kunin no shikeishû (1957) as Takao Nakamura
Yatsu ga satsujinsha da (1958)
Mikkokusha wa dare ka (1958) as Nakao
Jinsei gekijô - Seishun hen (1958)
 (1959)
Songoku: The Road to the West (1959)
Aru kengo no shogai (1959)
Seishun o kakero (1959) as Senzaka
The Birth of Japan (1959) as Spectator at Gods' Dance

1960

Ankokugai no taiketsu (1960) as Ichino
Kunisada Chuji (1960) as Tomimatsu
Denso Ningen (1960) as Onishi's Henchman
Dâisan hâtobanô kêtto (1960)
Otoko tai otoko (1960) as Killer
Dokuritsu gurentai nishi-e (1960)
Osaka jo monogatari (1961) as Interpreter
Ankokugai no dankon (1961)
Yojimbo (1961) as Yahachi
Honkon no yoru (1961)
Kurenai no umi (aka Blood on the Sea) (1961)
Shinko no otoko (1961)
Gorath (1962) as Drunk
Kurenai no sora (1962)
Dobunezumi sakusen (1962)
Chūshingura: Hana no Maki, Yuki no Maki (1962) as Takano, of the Chunagons
Ankokugai no kiba (1962)
Sengoku Yaro (1963)
Matango (1963) as Skulking Transitional Matango
Kokusai himitsu keisatsu—Shirei 8 go (aka Interpol Code 8) (1963) (note: first of five films in the "Kokusai himitsu keisatsu" series) as Shû
Hiken (1963)
Daitozoku (1963) as Granny the Witch
Eburi manshi no yuga-na seikatsu (1963)
Atragon (1963) as High Priest of Mu
Aa bakudan (1964) as Tetsu
Dogara, the Space Monster (1964) as Maki the Safecracker
 (1964)
Ghidorah, the Three-Headed Monster (1964) as Princess Salno's aide
Kwaidan (1964) (segment "Chawan no naka")
Samurai (1965) sd Matazaburo Hagiwara
Fort Graveyard (1965) as Shiga
Kokusai himitsu keisatsu: Kagi no kagi (1965) as Numaguchi, Snake-Training Gangster
Gohiki no shinshi (1966)
Abare Goemon (1966) as Heiroku
Dai-bosatsu toge (1966) as Lord Shuzen Kamio
Kiganjo no boken (1966) as Granny the Old Witch
Tenamonya Tokaido (1966)
Ebirah, Horror of the Deep (1966) as Red Bamboo Naval Officer
Satsujin kyo jidai (1967) as Shogo Mizorogi
Kokusai himitsu keisatsu: Zettai zetsumei (1967) as First Murderer
Sasaki Kojiro (1967)
King Kong Escapes (1967) as Dr. Who
Nihon no ichiban nagai hi (1967) as Captain Takeo Sasaki
Ultra Q (1967, TV series, Episode "Open the Door!") as Kenji Tomono - Mysterious Old Man
Dorifutazu desu yo! Zenshin zenshin matazenshin (1967)
Za taigasu: Sekai wa bokura o matteiru (1968) as Heraclues
Kiru (1968) as Gendayu Shimada
Nikudan (1968) as Father of Him
Konto55go—Seiki no Daijakuten (1968) as Sawada
Kureejii Mekishiko dai sakusen (aka Mexican Free-for-All) (1968)
Mighty Jack (1968, TV Series)
Akage (1969) as Dr. Gensai
Portrait of Hell (1969)
All Monsters Attack (1969) as Toy Consultant Shinpei Inami

1970
Kureji no nagurikomi Shimizu Minato (1970)
 (1970) as Prof. Fuyuki (uncredited)
Bakuchi-uchi: Inochi-huda (1971)
Kamen Rider (1971-1972, TV Series) as Dr. Shinigami "Ikadevil"
Return of Ultraman (1971, TV Series)
 (1971) as Okinawa Regional Officer
Shussho iwai (aka The Wolves) (1971)
Kamen Rider vs. Shocker (1972) as Dr. Shinigami
 (1972, TV Series) as Satan
Kamen Rider V3 (1973, TV Series) as Dr. Shinigami
Rupan Sansei: Nenriki chin sakusen (1974) as Assassin at Orphanage
Ultraman Leo (1974, TV Series) as Dodole / Alien Sarin
Tokkan (1975)
Kaiketsu Zubat (1977, TV series, Episode 1.2)
Chiisana supaman Ganbaron (1977, TV Series)
Goranger Versus JAKQ (1978) as General Sahara
Message from Space (1978) as Mother Dark
Buru Kurisumasu (1978)

1980
Misuta, Misesu, Misu Ronri (1980) as Ryuichi Shimomura
Seiun Kamen Machineman (1984, TV Series) as Prof. K
Saraba hakobune (1984) as Key maker
Mahjong horoki (1984) as Hachimaki
The Red Spectacles (1987) as Moongaze Ginji
Kaitô Ruby (1988)
Bungakusho satsujin jiken: Oinaru jyoso (1989)

1990
Hong Kong Paradise (1990)
 (1990) as Biwa player
Youkai tengoku: Ghost Hero (1990)
Daiyukai (1991) as Kushida
Kamitsukitai/Dorakiyura yori ai-0 (1991) as Servant
The Female Warriors (1991)
Shorishatachi (1992)
Za kakuto oh (1993)
Street Fighter II: The Movie (1994) as Ken and Ryu's Master (voice) (later established in the series as Goken)
Edogawa Rampo gekijo: Oshie to tabisuru otoko (1994)
Weather Woman (1995)
 (1996) as Master of Saiga
Otenki-oneesan (1996) as Chairman Shimamori
Moon Spiral (1996, TV series) as Tōru
 (1998) as Akaishi
Efu (1998)

2000
Keizoku/eiga (2000)
Sweet Sweet Ghost (2000) as Yasuri
Hakata Movie: Chinchiromai (2000) as God Computer
 (2000) as Katsuda
Oshikiri (2000)
Vengeance for Sale (2002)
Godzilla, Mothra and King Ghidorah: Giant Monsters All-Out Attack (2001) as Prof. Hirotoshi Isayama the Prophet (final film role)
Kamen Rider The First (2005) as Dr. Shinigami (archive footage, overdubbed by Eiji Maruyama)
??? (2009) – Master Li (archive footage)

References

External links

1926 births
2003 deaths
People from Kitakyushu
Kagoshima University alumni
Japanese male actors
Deaths from pneumonia in Japan